MLS on ESPN was the branding used for television presentations of Major League Soccer on ESPN properties, including ABC and ESPN2. Major League Soccer on ESPN debuted in 1996, the league's first season, and ended in 2022 when MLS and ESPN did not renew their broadcast contract. From 1996 to 2006, the weekly soccer match on ESPN2 was called MLS Soccer Saturday, but in the new contract, that was replaced by MLS Primetime Thursday. For the 2009 season and beyond, the Thursday telecast was replaced by a variety of primetime games on Wednesdays through Saturdays. From 2009 until 2019, as part of ESPN's far-reaching strategy of moving sports programming to ESPN, all matches - including MLS Cup - were on either ESPN or ESPN2.

History
On August 4, 2006, ESPN reached a comprehensive multimedia agreement with Soccer United Marketing (SUM) for the rights to Major League Soccer through 2014. As part of the eight-year agreement, ESPN2 televised 26 regular-season and three playoff MLS matches each year, all in primetime on Thursdays.

Highlights of the agreement included:
ESPN2 airing 26 regular-season MLS matches, primarily on Thursday nights.
ESPN2 airing three MLS playoff matches.
ABC airing one regular-season MLS match, the MLS All-Star Game, and MLS Cup. (replaced by ESPN from 2009 to 2017; returned in 2019)
Televised coverage of the first round of the MLS Draft.
MLS telecasts re-aired in full or abbreviated versions on any ESPN media platforms
Extensive footage rights for all ESPN media platforms such as SportsCenter, ESPNEWS, ESPN Motion, ESPN360, etc.
ESPN producing and being solely responsible for the content, whereas, they had not been able to do that in the past.

Also in 2007, ESPN2's coverage of MLS included new on-screen scoreboards, similar to those used on other sports telecasts.  In 2008, another new score graphic was debuted, this time in the upper left hand corner of the screen.

ESPN joined forces with Fox Sports and Univision to broadcast over 100 MLS games (combined), live and exclusive, from 2015 and 2022 in its succeeding media rights deal.

In 2023, MLS will move their inventory of games to MLS Season Pass, and the Fox Sports family. ESPN will not televise MLS matches for the first time since the league's inception in 1996.

Technology
In addition, ESPN added numerous production enhancements to the telecasts through the years. They included:

SkyCam: A common element during ESPN's NFL and MLB telecasts, SkyCam will return after making its debut in 2005 on select ABC and ESPN2 telecasts. The device provides an aerial view of the field, giving the viewer a unique angle to appreciate the development and speed of match action. 
MLS Wired: Telecasts feature use of the unobtrusive microphones, worn by select coaches and players, to capture some of the compelling in-game interactions and conversations.
KickTrax
HD: Beginning in 2007, all games aired in high-definition.

Criticism
ESPN was accused in 2011 by Soccer America writer Paul Kennedy of putting more emphasis on overall negativity and the more violent aspect of MLS games (such as two confrontations, two challenges and a player nursing a bloody head in its first six shots) in "Greatest Highlights of the Month" segment for their intermission reports.

Personalities

See also
MLS Soccer Saturday
MLS Primetime Thursday
MLS Saturday
MLS Game of the Week
MLS Soccer Sunday

References

External links
MLS at ESPN.com

Major League Soccer
Major League Soccer
2000s American television series
2010s American television series
2020s American television series
Major League Soccer on television
American Broadcasting Company original programming
ABC Sports
1996 American television series debuts